The Fightin' Fury is a 1921 American short silent Western film directed by and starring Hoot Gibson.

Cast
 Hoot Gibson
 Gertrude Olmstead
 Charles Newton
 Ben Corbett
 Otto Nelson
 John Judd

See also
 List of American films of 1921
 Hoot Gibson filmography

External links
 

1921 films
1921 short films
1921 Western (genre) films
American silent short films
American black-and-white films
Films directed by Hoot Gibson
Silent American Western (genre) films
1920s American films
1920s English-language films